Joseph Ryan (November 23, 1879 – April 30, 1972) was an American from Brockton, Massachusetts rower. He won an Olympic gold medal in the coxless pairs at the 1904 Summer Olympics, together with Robert Farnan.

References

1879 births
1972 deaths
American male rowers
Rowers at the 1904 Summer Olympics
Olympic gold medalists for the United States in rowing
Medalists at the 1904 Summer Olympics